The 197th Air Refueling Squadron (197 ARS) is a unit of the Arizona Air National Guard 161st Air Refueling Wing located at Goldwater Air National Guard Base, Phoenix, Arizona. The 197th is equipped with the KC-135R Stratotanker.

History

World War II
 see: 373d Fighter Group for expanded World War II history
Formed at Westover Field, Massachusetts, in August 1943. During World War II the 412th Fighter Squadron was assigned to the European Theater of Operations (ETO), Ninth Air Force in Western Europe. It was equipped with P-47 Thunderbolts.

The 412th flew its first combat mission on 8 May 1944, a fighter sweep over Normandy. It then took part in preinvasion activities, e.g., escorting B-26 Marauders to attack airdromes, bridges and railroads in Occupied France. The squadron patrolled the air over the beachhead when the Allies launched the Normandy invasion on 6 June 1944, and hit troops, tanks, roads, fuel depots and other targets in the assault area until the end of the month.

The 412th moved to the Continent in July 1944 where it struck railroads, hangars, boxcars, warehouses and other objectives to prevent reinforcements from reaching the front at St. Lo, where the Allies broke through on 25 July 1944. The squadron bombed such targets as troops in the Falaise-Argentan area in August 1944. During the Battle of the Bulge, December 1944 – January 1945, the 412th concentrated on the destruction of bridges, marshalling yards and highways. It flew reconnaissance missions to support ground operations in the Rhine Valley in March 1945, hitting airfields, motor transports, etc. The squadron continued tactical air operations until 4 May 1945.

Returned to the United States and prepared for transfer to the Pacific Theater during the Summer of 1945, the Japanese Capitulation in August led to the squadron's inactivation in November 1945.

Arizona Air National Guard

The wartime 412th Fighter Squadron was reactivated and re-designated as the 197th Fighter Squadron, and was allotted to the Arizona Air National Guard, on 24 May 1946. It was organized at Luke AFB, Arizona and was extended federal recognition on 12 December 1946. The 197th Fighter Squadron was entitled to the history, honors, and colors of the 412th. The squadron was equipped with F-47D Thunderbolts and was allocated to the Fourth Air Force, Continental Air Command by the National Guard Bureau.

During the Korean War, the 197th was federalized on 1 February 1951 and assigned to Air Training Command. ATC equipped the squadron with F-84B Thunderjet aircraft and used it as a training organization.  Some fighter pilots went to Korea to fly combat missions. Other squadron personnel, because of their experience, were sent to bases in the U.S. and Japan to train new people entering the Air Force. The squadron was released from active duty and returned to Arizona state control, 1 November 1952.

With the release from active service, the federal government authorized the construction of a new base at Sky Harbor Airport in Phoenix for the Arizona Air National Guard.  The 197th returned to flying the F-51H Mustangs as part of Tactical Air Command.

Air Defense mission

In 1954, the unit was reassigned to Air Defense Command (ADC), with a new mission of Air Defense of the Phoenix area. The prop-driven Mustangs were replaced by F-86A Sabre day fighters, and the squadron was re-designated as the 197th Fighter-Interceptor Squadron.  On 2 October 1957, the Arizona Air National Guard 197th FIS was authorized to expand to a group level, and the 161st Fighter-Interceptor Group was established by the National Guard Bureau. The 197th FIS becoming the group's flying squadron. Other squadrons assigned into the group were the 161st Headquarters, 161st Material Squadron (Maintenance), 161st Combat Support Squadron, and the 161st USAF Dispensary.

The F-86A Sabre day fighters were replaced in 1958 by the all-weather/day-night F-86L Sabre Interceptor aircraft, and in 1960, the 197th was one of three selected ANG units to receive F-104A Starfighter interceptors from the ADC active-duty interceptor forces.  The Copperheads, as a result of the national recognition as one of the best air defense units in the nation, were chosen to fly the new high performance jet fighter.

The 161st FIG was called into active service in November 1961 as the construction of the infamous "Berlin Wall" pushed the world to the brink of war. Within a month after mobilization, 750 personnel and 22 197th FIS F-104 aircraft were in place at Ramstein Air Base, West Germany as the unit took up flying daily air defense patrols at the edge of the Iron Curtain.  With world tension easing, the squadron returned home in August 1962.

Transport mission
With the return to Arizona, the unit was reassigned from ADC to the Military Air Transport Service (MATS) in October 1962.  The Mach-2 Starfighters were exchanged for large, 4-engined C-97G Stratofreighters with a mission of worldwide transport of personnel, supplies and equipment.   The 197th Air Transport Squadron (later Military Airlift Squadron) flew missions to the Caribbean, Europe, Japan, South Vietnam, Thailand and Australia.   During the height of the Vietnam War, the squadron routinely flew trans-Pacific medical evacuation missions from hospitals in South Vietnam, Japan, and the Philippines of wounded servicemen and women to the United States, being designated as an Aeromedical Transport Squadron.   In 1969 the Military Airlift Squadron designation was returned and the unit again flew scheduled transport missions for Military Airlift Command (MAC).

Air Refueling
In 1972, military requirements resulted in a change in mission when the group was reassigned from MAC transport duties to the Strategic Air Command (SAC).  Under SAC the group became an Air Refueling unit, being with the air refueling version of the C-97 transport, the KC-97 Stratofreighter.  Familiarity with the aircraft led to a smooth transition from MAC to the new refueling mission.   In 1977, SAC announced that Air National Guard refueling units would begin to upgrade to the Boeing KC-135 Stratotanker.  The 197th Air Refueling Squadron has been flying the KC-135 for almost 40 years.

During the 1991 Gulf War, Air National Guard tanker units were quickly called into action. An around-the-clock airlift began to support the buildup to the conflict, Operation Desert Shield.  Tankers and crews from the 161st were some of the first to arrive in Saudi Arabia.  Elements of the 197th ARS were assigned to the 1709th Air Refueling Wing (Provisional), flying from King Abdul Aziz Air Base, Jeddah, Saudi Arabia.

From the start and for the duration, tankers servicing the conflict left Phoenix weekly, loaded with maintenance and support technicians who worked in the Saudi Arabian desert up to 45 days, and in some cases more.  As the allies prepared to move against Iraq, aircraft crews, maintenance personnel, medics, fire fighters, security forces and food service technicians were dispatched to bases in Europe and the United States. Before the war in the Persian Gulf was concluded more than two-thirds of the force assigned to the 161st Air Refueling Group had served on active duty in some capacity to support the Middle East effort.

In 1994, 1995 and 1997 the unit deployed to Pisa, Italy where our tankers supported NATO operations in Bosnia. 1997 also saw the 161st facing challenges in the United Arab Emirates. The unit was vital to the success of Operation Deny Flight and Operation Southern Watch. 1 October 1995, marked another key change in the unit's long history. The 161st Air Refueling Group was redesignated as the 161st Air Refueling Wing under the USAF Air Mobility Command (AMC). 1996 saw the Copperheads turn 50 years old. The unit celebrated with year-round contests and a 50th Anniversary Celebration in December.

The 161st sent about 130 personnel to Operation Northern Watch early in 1999. Based at Incirlik Air Base, Turkey, the unit supported flight operations within the northern no-fly zone over Iraq. Early in the second quarter of 1999, 161st Copperheads were quickly pressed into service over Kosovo for Operation Allied Force. Nearly 200 unit airmen served on active duty for about two months, flying 125 missions to offload almost 2.5 million gallons of fuel. The airmen returned to Phoenix in late June 1999.

Although not directly called as a unit the "Copperheads" played a vital role in support units during Operation Enduring Freedom in 2003. Many Security Forces saw duty overseas directly supporting bases while maintenance and operations personnel were called to support the ongoing operations.

Lineage

 Constituted as 412th Fighter Squadron on 25 May 1943
 Activated on 15 August 1943
 Inactivated on 7 November 1945
 Re-designated: 197th Fighter Squadron and allotted to Arizona ANG on 24 May 1946
 Extended federal recognition on 12 December 1946
 Federalized and placed on active duty, 1 February 1951
 Released from active duty and returned to Arizona state control, 1 November 1952
 Re-designated: 197th Fighter-Bomber Squadron on 1 November 1952
 Re-designated: 197th Fighter-Interceptor Squadron on 1 March 1954
 Federalized and placed on active duty, 1 November 1961
 Released from active duty and returned to Arizona state control, 15 August 1962
 Re-designated: 197th Air Transport Squadron on 1 October 1962
 Re-designated: 197th Military Airlift Squadron on 1 January 1966
 Re-designated: 197th Aeromedical Transport Squadron on 16 August 1968
 Re-designated: 197th Military Airlift Squadron on 1 December 1969
 Re-designated: 197th Air Refueling Squadron on 1 August 1972

Assignments
 373d Fighter Group, 15 Aug 1943 – 7 Nov 1945
 146th Fighter Group, 12 December 1946
 127th Pilot Training Group, 1 Feb 1951 – 1 Nov 1952
 146th Fighter-Bomber Group, 1 November 1952
 146th Fighter-Interceptor Group, 1 July 1955
 161st Fighter-Interceptor Group, 2 October 1957
 86th Air Division, 25 November 1961
 161st Fighter-Interceptor Group, 11 July 1962
 161st Air Transport Group, 1 October 1962
 161st Military Airlift Group, 8 January 1966
 161st Aero Medical Airlift Group, 16 August 1968
 161st Military Airlift Group, 1 December 1969
 161st Air Refueling Group, 1 August 1972
 161st Operations Group, 1 October 1995

Stations

 Westover Field, Massachusetts, 15 August 1943
 Norfolk Airport, Virginia, 23 October 1943
 Richmond Army Air Base, Virginia, 15 February – 15 March 1944
 RAF Woodchurch (AAF-419), England, 4 April – 4 July 1944
 Tour-en-Bessin Airfield (A-13), France, 19 July 1944
 Saint James Airfield (A-29), France, 19 August 1944
 Reims/Champagne Airfield (A-62), France, 19 September 1944
 Le Culot Airfield (A-89), Belgium, 22 October 1944
 Venlo Airfield (Y-55), Netherlands, 11 March 1945

 Lippstadt Airfield (Y-98), Germany, 20 April 1945
 AAF Station Illesheim, Germany, 20 May–July 1945
 Sioux Falls Army Air Field, South Dakota, 4 August 1945
 Seymour Johnson Field, North Carolina, 20 August 1945
 Mitchel Field, New York, 28 September – 7 November 1945
 Luke Army Airfield (later AFB), Arizona, 12 December 1946
 Sky Harbor Airport, Arizona, 1 November 1952
 Designated: Goldwater Air National Guard Base, 1991–Present
 Operated from: Ramstein AB, West Germany, Nov 1961-15 Aug 1962

Aircraft

 P-47 Thunderbolt, 1943–1945
 F-51D Mustang, 1947–1950, 1952–1954
 F-84B Thunderjet, 1950–1951
 F-84E/G Thunderjet, 1951–1952
 F-86A Sabre, 1954–1958
 F-86L Sabre Interceptor, 1958–1960

 F-104A Starfighter, 1960–1962
 C-97G Stratofreighter, 1962–1972
 KC-97L Stratotanker, 1972–1977
 KC-135A Stratotanker, 1977–1982
 KC-135E Stratotanker, 1982–2007
 KC-135R Stratotanker, 2007–Present

Aircraft flying in this unit
KC-135
55-3143(E) (Dec'93); 57-1452(E) (Dec'93); 57-1475(E) (Dec'93); 57-1496(E) (Dec'93)

References

 197th Air Refueling Squadron lineage and history
 Cornett, Lloyd H; Johnson, Mildred W (1980). A Handbook of Aerospace Defense Organization, 1946–1980. Peterson AFB, CO: Office of History, Aerospace Defense Center.
 
 Rogers, B. (2006). United States Air Force Unit Designations Since 1978.

External links

Squadrons of the United States Air National Guard
Air refueling squadrons of the United States Air Force
Military units and formations in Arizona